Ron A. H. Langeveld (born October 10, 1966) is a Dutch chess player who holds the ICCF title of International Correspondence Chess Grandmaster.

Biography
In 2002 Langeveld won the Dutch correspondence chess championship. In 2014 he won the 26th World Correspondence Chess Championship (2010–2014). 

He graduated from the Erasmus University Rotterdam. He works as a systems engineer in a company that sells insurance software.

References

External links
 
 

1966 births
Living people
World Correspondence Chess Champions
Correspondence chess grandmasters
Dutch chess players
Erasmus University Rotterdam alumni
Sportspeople from Utrecht (city)
20th-century Dutch people